Gordon Lake Airport  is located near Gordon Lake, Alberta, Canada.

References

External links
Page about this airport  on COPA's Places to Fly airport directory

Registered aerodromes in Alberta
Transport in the Regional Municipality of Wood Buffalo